The Morning Post Weekly, also known as Chenbao Zhoukan was a Chinese-language magazine founded by the  in December 2007 in Changsha, Hunan. The magazine officially ceased publication on 1 January 2018.

History
Morning Post Weekly was established in December 2007. It was revamped in April 2013, after which the newspaper was issued for 14 prefectures in the whole Hunan Province.

In October 2017, Morning Post Weekly conducted an interview with French sinologist Michel Bonnin. He said that the Chinese should not distort the facts of "Down to the Countryside Movement" because of nostalgia. He believed that "Down to the Countryside Movement" (especially after 1968) was a political movement mainly initiated by Mao Zedong. He argued that the context and image of the movement at that time were completely shrouded by the official propaganda of the Chinese Government, and no other context could emerge.

References

2007 establishments in China
2018 disestablishments in China
Defunct magazines published in China
Defunct political magazines
Magazines established in 2007
Magazines disestablished in 2018